Jia Kui (174 – October 228), originally named Jia Qu, courtesy name Liangdao, was a Chinese military general and politician who lived during the late Eastern Han dynasty of China. He served under the state of Cao Wei during the Three Kingdoms period.

Life
Jia Kui was from Xiangling County, Hedong Commandery, which is present-day Xiangfen County, Shanxi. After appointments to several posts as prefect, administrator and Registrar to the Imperial Chancellor, Jia Kui was enfeoffed as a Secondary Marquis for his work in keeping his jurisdictions prepared for battle and well-supplied. During a skirmish with enemy forces from Cao Wei's rival state Eastern Wu, Jia Kui defeated the Wu general Lü Fan and earned further accolades.

In 228, during the reign of Cao Rui, Jia Kui and Cao Xiu were put in command of an army to invade Wu. This led to the Battle of Shiting. Cao Xiu fell for a ruse by the Wu general Zhou Fang, who pretended to defect to the Wei side. However, Jia Kui found Zhou Fang's defection suspicious and maintained his guard. Although the Wu forces won the battle, Jia Kui managed to save Cao Xiu after his defeat and protect him while he retreated. Jia Kui died shortly after the battle.

Jia Kui's son, Jia Chong, was a close aide to the Wei regent Sima Zhao. He continued serving as an official under the Jin dynasty after the end of the Three Kingdoms period, and was enfeoffed as a duke after his daughter Jia Nanfeng married the future Emperor Hui.

See also
 Lists of people of the Three Kingdoms

Notes

References

 Chen, Shou (3rd century). Records of the Three Kingdoms (Sanguozhi).
 
 Pei, Songzhi (5th century). Annotations to Records of the Three Kingdoms (Sanguozhi zhu).

174 births
228 deaths
Cao Wei politicians
Cao Wei generals
Generals under Cao Cao
Han dynasty generals from Shanxi
Han dynasty politicians from Shanxi
Officials under Cao Cao
Political office-holders in Hebei
Political office-holders in Henan
Politicians from Linfen